Nowe Kramsko  is a village in the administrative district of Gmina Babimost, within Zielona Góra County, Lubusz Voivodeship, in western Poland.

The village has an approximate population of 854.

The Zielona Góra Airport is located in Nowe Kramsko.

History
Nowe Kramsko was founded in the 13th century. In 1314 it was granted to the Cistercians, who remained owners until the Partitions of Poland, when it was annexed by Prussia. Briefly regained by Poles in 1807 as part of the short-lived Duchy of Warsaw, in 1815 it was annexed by Prussia again. Despite the Germanisation policies pursued by the Prussian authorities towards the local population, Polish associations were founded in the village: the Association of Industrialists and Farmers (Towarzystwo Przemysłowców i Rolników) in 1895 and the Catholic Association of Polish Workers (Katolickie Towarzystwo Robotników Polskich) in 1904.

Sights
Among the historic sights of Nowe Kramsko are the church of the Nativity of the Virgin Mary with the church cemetery, an old wooden windmill and a manor house, which currently houses a library. There is also a memorial stone dedicated to the Greater Poland insurgents of 1918–19.

Notable people
 (born 1919), Polish Conventual Franciscan, sybirak, centenarian
 (1936–2011), Polish historian

Gallery

References

Nowe Kramsko